Various newspapers, organisations and individuals endorsed parties or individual candidates for the 2017 United Kingdom general election.

Endorsements for parties

Newspapers and magazines

National daily newspapers

National Sunday newspapers

National weekly newspapers

National political magazines

Other national publications

Scottish newspapers

Northern Irish newspapers

Local publications

Individuals

Conservative Party

Green Party of England and Wales 
 Rebecca Atkinson-Lord, theatre director and writer (endorsing the Greens, Liberal Democrats and Labour).
 Michaela Coel, poet, singer-songwriter, screenwriter and actress (endorsing the Greens and Labour).
 Matt Haig, novelist and journalist.
 Vivienne Westwood, fashion designer.

Labour Party

Liberal Democrats

Plaid Cymru 

 Rhodri Lloyd, rugby league player.

Scottish National Party 

 Limmy, comedian, actor and web developer (endorsed Labour outside of Scotland).
 Eddi Reader, singer-songwriter (endorsed Labour outside of Scotland).

UK Independence Party 
 Anne Marie Waters, political activist (endorsed both Conservatives and UKIP).

Sinn Féin 
 James McClean, professional footballer

Organisations

Conservative Party 
 Leave.EU (have also endorsed candidates of other parties in some specific constituencies)

Labour Party 
 Alliance for Workers' Liberty (AWL)
Associated Society of Locomotive Engineers and Firemen (ASLEF)
 Bob Crow Brigade 
 Communication Workers Union (CWU)
 Communist Party of Britain
 Fire Brigades Union (FBU)
 General, Municipal, Boilermakers and Allied Trade Union (GMB)
 The Hemp Trading Company
 Left Unity
 National Union of Rail, Maritime and Transport Workers (RMT)
 Ninja Tune
 Odd Box Records
 Public and Commercial Services Union
 Stop the War Coalition
 Trade Union and Socialist Coalition (TUSC)
 Union of Shop, Distributive and Allied Workers (USDAW)
 Unite the Union
 University and College Union (UCU)

Parties 
Some parties which only contest elections in certain parts of the United Kingdom have endorsed political parties in areas they don't contest.
 The Liberal Democrats (standing in Great Britain) and Alliance Party of Northern Ireland (standing in Northern Ireland) endorsed each other.
 Workers Revolutionary Party endorsed Labour in constituencies they are not contesting.

Endorsements for individual candidates

Aberavon 

For Stephen Kinnock (Labour):
More United
 Ross Kemp, English actor, author and investigative journalist.

Amber Valley 
For Nigel Mills (Conservative):
 UKIP local party

Arfon 
For Hywel Williams (Plaid Cymru):
Democracy in Europe Movement 2025

Ashfield 

For Gloria De Piero (Labour):
More United

Banbury 

For Roseanne Edwards (Independent):
National Health Action Party

Barrow and Furness 

For John Woodcock (Labour Co-operative):
More United

Bassetlaw 
For John Mann (Labour):
 Leave.EU

Belfast East 

For Gavin Robinson (DUP):
 Loyalist Communities Council, umbrella group backed by the three main loyalist paramilitary organisations: Ulster Defence Association, the Ulster Volunteer Force and the Red Hand Commando

For Naomi Long (Alliance):
Open Britain

Belfast North 

For Nigel Dodds (DUP):
 Loyalist Communities Council, umbrella group backed by the three main loyalist paramilitary organisations: Ulster Defence Association, the Ulster Volunteer Force and the Red Hand Commando

Belfast South 

For Emma Little Pengelly (DUP):
 Ulster Political Research Group
 Loyalist Communities Council, umbrella group backed by the three main loyalist paramilitary organisations: Ulster Defence Association, the Ulster Volunteer Force and the Red Hand Commando

Birmingham Edgbaston 

For Preet Gill (Labour):
 Sikh Federation

Birmingham Erdington 

For Jack Dromey (Labour):
More United

Birmingham Yardley 

For Jess Phillips (Labour):
Iain Dale, political commentator and former Conservative Party politician

Bishop Auckland 

For Helen Goodman (Labour):
Open Britain

Bournemouth West 
For Conor Burns (Conservative):
UKIP local party

Brecon and Radnorshire 

For James Gibson-Watt (Liberal Democrat):
Open Britain

Brentford and Isleworth 

For Ruth Cadbury (Labour):
 Eddie Marsan, actor.
 More United

Brighton Kemptown 
For Lloyd Russell-Moyle (Labour):
 The Green Party local party.

Brighton Pavilion 

For Caroline Lucas (Green):
Open Britain
More United
Liberal Democrat local party
Vince Cable, former Liberal Democrat MP
Matt Haig, novelist and journalist
Best for Britain
Democracy in Europe Movement 2025

Bristol East 

For Kerry McCarthy (Labour):
Best for Britain

Bristol North West 

For Darren Jones (Labour):
Open Britain

Bristol West 

For Molly Scott Cato (Green):
Hugh Fearnley-Whittingstall, chef and campaigner
George Monbiot, environmentalist and writer
Jonathon Porritt, environmentalist and writer
Chris T-T, singer and songwriter
National Health Action Party

Broxtowe 

For Anna Soubry (Conservative):
More United

Caithness, Sutherland and Easter Ross 

For Jamie Stone (Liberal Democrat):
More United

Camberwell and Peckham 
For Harriet Harman (Labour):
 Janice Turner

Cambridge 

For Julian Huppert (Liberal Democrat):
Iain Dale, political commentator and former Conservative Party politician

Canterbury 
For Julian Brazier (Conservative):
 UKIP local party

Cannock Chase 

For Paul Dadge (Labour):
Hugh Grant, English actor and film producer
Steve Coogan, Actor and comedian

Cardiff Central 

For Jo Stevens (Labour):
Best for Britain

Cardiff South and Penarth 

For Stephen Doughty (Labour Co-operative):
More United

Cardiff West 

For Kevin Brennan (Labour):
Best for Britain
 Dafydd Elis-Thomas, former leader of Plaid Cymru.

Carshalton and Wallington 

For Tom Brake (Liberal Democrat):
Open Britain
Best for Britain
Ranulph Fiennes, English explorer

For Matthew Maxwell-Scott (Conservative Party)
UKIP local party

Ceredigion 

For Mark Williams (Liberal Democrat):
More United

Chatham and Aylesford 

For Tracey Crouch (Conservative):
Iain Dale, political commentator and former Conservative Party politician

Cheadle 

For Mark Hunter (Liberal Democrat):
More United
Best for Britain

Chingford and Woodford Green 

For Bilal Mahmood (Labour):
Open Britain

For Iain Duncan Smith (Conservative):
UKIP local party

Christchurch 

For Christopher Chope (Conservative):
UKIP local party

Chipping Barnet 

For Emma Whysall (Labour):
Open Britain

Dulwich and West Norwood

For Rachel Wolf (Conservative):
UKIP local branch 

For Rashid Nix (Green): 
Save Central Hill

Ealing Central and Acton 

For Rupa Huq (Labour):
 Best for Britain
 The Green Party local party
 Konnie Huq, television presenter and writer, candidate's sister.
 Shappi Khorsandi, comedian and author.

East Dunbartonshire 

For Jo Swinson (Liberal Democrat):
More United

Eastbourne 
For Stephen Lloyd (Liberal Democrat):
Open Britain

Edinburgh South 

For Ian Murray (Labour):
Open Britain
More United

Edinburgh West 

For Christine Jardine (Liberal Democrat):
More United

For Toni Giugliano (Scottish National Party):
Democracy in Europe Movement 2025

Enfield Southgate 

For Bambos Charalambous (Labour):
Open Britain

Exeter 

For Ben Bradshaw (Labour):
Open Britain

Feltham and Heston 

For Seema Malhotra (Labour):
More United

Fermanagh and South Tyrone 
For Tom Elliott (UUP):
 Leave.EU
 Loyalist Communities Council, umbrella group backed by the three main loyalist paramilitary organisations: Ulster Defence Association, the Ulster Volunteer Force and the Red Hand Commando

Glasgow South West 
For Matt Kerr (Labour and Co-operative):
Democracy in Europe Movement 2025

Gower 

For Tonia Antoniazzi (Labour):
 The Green Party local party
Open Britain

Guildford 

For Mark Bray-Perry (Green):
National Health Action Party

Hackney South and Shoreditch 

For Meg Hillier (Labour):
Oliver Kamm, journalist and writer

Hampstead and Kilburn 

For Tulip Siddiq (Labour):
Best for Britain
More United
 Robert Webb, comedian and actor.

Hammersmith 

For Andy Slaughter (Labour):
Best for Britain

Harborough 
For Teck Khong (UKIP):
 Leave.EU

Harrogate and Knaresborough 
For Helen Flynn (Liberal Democrat):
The Green Party local party

Hayes and Harlington 
For John McDonnell (Labour):
Democracy in Europe Movement 2025

Harrow West 
For Gareth Thomas (Labour Co-operative):
More United
Best for Britain

Hazel Grove 

For Lisa Smart (Liberal Democrat):
Open Britain
Best for Britain

Hendon 

For Mike Katz (Labour):
Open Britain

High Peak 
For Andrew Bingham (Conservative):
 UKIP local party

Hornsey and Wood Green 

For Catherine West (Labour):
Phil Davis, actor, writer and director
Linda Grant, novelist and journalist

For Nimco Ali (Women's Equality):
Sue Black, computer scientist, academic and social entrepreneur
Hibo Wardere, author, anti-female genital mutilation campaigner
Angela Saini, science journalist, broadcaster and author
Heydon Prowse activist, journalist, and comedian

Hove 

For Peter Kyle (Labour):
Open Britain
More United
Best for Britain

Ilford North 

For Lee Scott (Conservative):
 UKIP local party

For Wes Streeting (Labour):
 The Green Party local party
 Ian McKellen, actor
Open Britain

Isle of Wight 

For Vix Lowthion (Green):
More United
Best for Britain
National Health Action Party

Kensington 

For Emma Dent Coad (Labour):
Open Britain

Kettering 

For Philip Hollobone (Conservative):
UKIP local party

Kingston and Surbiton 

For Ed Davey (Liberal Democrat):
Open Britain

Kingston upon Hull West and Hessle 

For Michelle Dewberry (Independent):
 Alan Sugar, business magnate and crossbench peer.

Leeds North East 

For Fabian Hamilton (Labour):
Best for Britain

Leeds West 

For Rachel Reeves (Labour):
More United

Leicester West 

For Liz Kendall (Labour):
Grace Petrie, singer-songwriter
Open Britain
More United

Lewes 

For Kelly-Marie Blundell (Liberal Democrat):
Open Britain
More United
Democracy in Europe Movement 2025

Leyton and Wanstead 

For John Cryer (Labour):
UKIP local party

Lincoln 

For Karl McCartney (Conservative):
UKIP local party

Luton North 
For Kelvin Hopkins (Labour);
 Leave.EU
Democracy in Europe Movement 2025

Luton South 

For Gavin Shuker (Labour):
More United

Maidenhead 
For Gerard Batten (UKIP):
 Leave.EU

Manchester Gorton 
For George Galloway (Independent):
 Leave.EU

For Afzal Khan (Labour):
 Harriet Williamson, journalist.
 Bethany Black, comedian.

Mitcham and Morden 
For Siobhain McDonagh (Labour):
 Steve Brookstein
 Ross Kemp

Morley and Outwood 
For Neil Dawson (Labour):
The Green Party local party

Montgomeryshire 

For Jane Dodds (Liberal Democrat):
More United

New Forest East 

For Julian Lewis (Conservative):
UKIP local party

New Forest West 

For Desmond Swayne (Conservative):
UKIP local party

Newcastle upon Tyne North 

For Catherine McKinnell (Labour):
Open Britain

Nottingham South 

For Lilian Greenwood (Labour):
Open Britain

North East Fife 

For Elizabeth Riches (Liberal Democrat):
More United

North East Somerset 
For Robin Moss (Labour):
 Los Campesinos!, indie pop band

North Norfolk 

For Norman Lamb (Liberal Democrat):
Open Britain
More United
Frank Bruno, boxer
For James Wild (Conservative):
 UKIP local party

North West Leicestershire 

For Andrew Bridgen (Conservative):
UKIP local party

Norwich North 

For Chloe Smith (Conservative):
UKIP local party.

Norwich South 

For Lana Hempsall (Conservative):
UKIP local party.

For Clive Lewis (Labour):
More United
Best for Britain
Democracy in Europe Movement 2025

Orkney and Shetland 

For Alistair Carmichael (Liberal Democrat):
More United

Oxford East 

For Larry Sanders (Green):
National Health Action Party

Oxford West and Abingdon 

For Layla Moran (Liberal Democrat):
Open Britain
Green Party local party

Paisley and Renfrewshire South 

For Mhairi Black (Scottish National Party):
Democracy in Europe Movement 2025

Penistone and Stocksbridge 

For Angela Smith (Labour):
Open Britain

Peterborough 

For Stewart Jackson (Conservative):
UKIP local party

Plymouth Moor View 

For Sue Dann (Labour):
 Billy Bragg, singer, songwriter and activist.

Plymouth Sutton and Devonport 

For Luke Pollard (Labour):
 Billy Bragg, singer, songwriter and activist.

Pontypridd 

For Owen Smith (Labour):
More United
Open Britain

Pudsey 

For Ian McCargo (Labour):

The Green Party local party

Rhondda 

For Chris Bryant (Labour):
More United

Richmond Park 

For Sarah Olney (Liberal Democrat):
The Green Party local party
Best for Britain

Salford and Eccles 

For Rebecca Long-Bailey (Labour):
Democracy in Europe Movement 2025

Sedgefield 

For Phil Wilson (Labour):
Open Britain

Sheffield Central 

For Natalie Bennett (Green):
National Health Action Party

Sheffield Hallam 

For Nick Clegg (Liberal Democrat):
Open Britain
Best for Britain
Democracy in Europe Movement 2025

Shipley 
For Philip Davies (Conservative):
UKIP local party

For Sophie Walker (Women's Equality):
The Green Party local party
More United
Caroline Criado Perez, feminist activist and journalist
June Sarpong, television presenter
Democracy in Europe Movement 2025

Skipton and Ripon 

For Andy Brown (Green):
Liberal Democrat local party

Somerton and Frome 

For David Warburton (Conservative):
 UKIP local party

South Leicestershire 
For Roger Helmer (UKIP):
 Leave.EU

South West Surrey 

For Louise Irvine (National Health Action):
The Green Party local party
Brian May, musician and astrophysicist
Marcus Chown, science writer, journalist and broadcaster
Democracy in Europe Movement 2025

Southampton Test 

For Alan Whitehead (Labour):
Open Britain
The Green Party local party

Southport 

For Sue McGuire (Liberal Democrat):
More United

St Albans 

For Daisy Cooper (Liberal Democrat):
More United

St Ives 

For Andrew George (Liberal Democrat):
Open Britain
More United

Stalybridge and Hyde 

For Jonathan Reynolds (Labour):
More United

Stockton South 

For James Wharton (Conservative):
Steve Gibson, chairman of Middlesbrough football club and former Labour councillor

Streatham 

For Chuka Umunna (Labour):
More United

Surrey Heath 
For Ann-Marie Barker (Liberal Democrat):
 Emma Kennedy, actress, writer and presenter.

Sutton and Cheam 

For Amna Ahmad (Liberal Democrat):
Open Britain
More United

Swindon South 

For Martin Costello (UKIP):
 Leave.EU

Thornbury and Yate 

For Claire Young (Liberal Democrat):
Open Britain

Thurrock 
For Tim Aker (UKIP):
 Leave.EU
For Jackie Doyle-Price (Conservative):
Sue Moxley, television presenter and beauty editor
David Van Day, singer and media personality

Tooting 

For Rosena Allin-Khan (Labour):
More United

Tottenham 

For David Lammy (Labour):
David Eldridge, dramatist
More United

Twickenham 

For Vince Cable (Liberal Democrat):
The Green Party local party
More United
Samantha Bond, actress.

Vauxhall 

For Kate Hoey (Labour)
UK Independence Party local branch
Paul Nuttall, former leader of the UK Independence Party
Tony Adams, former captain of Arsenal football team.
Piers Corbyn, eurosceptic meteorologist and brother to Labour Leader Jeremy Corbyn.

For George Turner (Liberal Democrat):
Gia Milinovich, television presenter and writer
Gina Miller, business owner and campaigner against Brexit
Oliver Kamm, leader writer and columnist for The Times
More United
Open Britain

Wakefield 

For Antony Calvert (Conservative):
UKIP local party

For Mary Creagh (Labour):
Open Britain
Lewis Thompson, UKIP candidate for Normanton, Pontefract and Castleford

Wellingborough 

For Peter Bone (Conservative):
UKIP local party

Wells 

For James Heappey (Conservative):
 UKIP local party

For Tessa Munt (Liberal Democrat):
Open Britain
More United

Wigan 

For Lisa Nandy (Labour):
Democracy in Europe Movement 2025

Wirral South 

For Alison McGovern (Labour):
Open Britain
More United

Wolverhampton North East 

For Emma Reynolds (Labour):
More United

Wolverhampton South East 

For Pat McFadden (Labour):
Open Britain

Wrexham 

For Ian Lucas (Labour):
More United

Wycombe 

For Rafiq Raqa (Labour):
Open Britain

Yeovil 

For Marcus Fysh (Conservative):
 UKIP local party
For Jo Roundell Greene (Liberal Democrat):
More United

York Central 

For Rachael Maskell (Labour):
The Green Party local party

For Ed Young (Conservative):
 UKIP local party

York Outer 

For Julian Sturdy (Conservative)
 UKIP local party

References 

2017 United Kingdom general election
United Kingdom 2017 endorsements
General election, 2017